Alberta Provincial Highway No. 38, commonly referred to as Highway 38, is a  east–west highway in central Alberta, Canada. It extends from Highway 28 in Redwater to a 'T' junction with Highway 45 north of Bruderheim.

Major intersections 
From west to east:

References 

038